William Conant Church (August 11, 1836 – May 23, 1917) was an American journalist and soldier. He was the co-founder and second president of the National Rifle Association.

Life and work 
Church was born in Rochester, New York on August 11, 1836, to the Reverend Pharcellus Church. He was educated in the Boston Latin School.  While still a youth, he helped his father edit and publish the New York Chronicle.

In 1860, he became publisher of The Sun and of the New York Chronicle. In 1861–62 he was Washington correspondent of The New York Times.

He resigned his journalistic position on his appointment as captain in the United States Volunteers in 1862, and served for one year, receiving brevets of major and lieutenant colonel.

In 1863, he and his brother, Francis Pharcellus Church, established The Army and Navy Journal, which published under various names for 151 years, ending its run in 2014 as Armed Forces Journal. In 1866, the pair founded the Galaxy Magazine.

He and George Wood Wingate established the National Rifle Association in 1871, and in 1872 he replaced its first president, the retired general Ambrose Burnside.

Church was government commissioner to inspect the Northern Pacific Railroad in 1882.

He wrote two biographies, of John Ericsson in 1891, and Ulysses S. Grant in 1899.
He published the Army and Navy Journal. In one issue he criticized the living arrangements aboard USS Monitor, a vessel built by John Ericsson.

Church was also one of the founders of the Metropolitan Museum of Art, an original member of the Military Order of the Loyal Legion of the United States, and became a director and lifetime member of the New York Zoological Society.

Church died on May 23, 1917. His funeral took place at Grace Church in Lower Manhattan.

References

Further reading

External links 
 William Conant Church papers, 1863–1909, bulk (1863–1878), at the New York Public Library
 Obituary in the New York Times

1836 births
1917 deaths
American newspaper editors
Union Army officers
The New York Times writers
Writers from Rochester, New York
United States Army officers
People associated with the Metropolitan Museum of Art
Burials at Sleepy Hollow Cemetery
Presidents of the National Rifle Association
Military personnel from Rochester, New York